Edgar Albert Kneen (9 September 1882 – 24 April 1962) was an Australian rules footballer who played for the Fitzroy Football Club and Melbourne University Football Club.

Football
He captained University in 1910 and was a member of the 1904 Fitzroy premiership side.

Death
Kneen died in April 1962 and was buried in the Cheltenham Pioneer Cemetery, Charman Road on 26 April.

Notes

References
  Holmesby, Russell & Main, Jim (2014), The Encyclopedia of AFL Footballers: Every AFL/VFL player since 1897 (10th ed.), Melbourne, Victoria: Bas Publishing.

External links

Friends of Cheltenham and Regional Cemeteries Inc.

Fitzroy Football Club players
Fitzroy Football Club Premiership players
University Football Club players
Australian rules footballers from Melbourne
1882 births
1962 deaths
One-time VFL/AFL Premiership players
People from Fitzroy, Victoria